Daniele Liotti (born 8 June 1994) is an Italian football player. He plays for  club Reggina.

Club career
On 9 January 2020, Liotti signed a contract with Reggina until June 2022. On 11 January 2022, he returned to Cosenza on loan until the end of the season.

References

External links
 
 

1994 births
People from Vibo Valentia
Sportspeople from the Province of Vibo Valentia
Living people
Italian footballers
Association football midfielders
Association football fullbacks
U.S. Catanzaro 1929 players
Cosenza Calcio players
S.S.D. Città di Brindisi players
S.S. Juve Stabia players
FeralpiSalò players
Siracusa Calcio players
Reggina 1914 players
Pisa S.C. players
Serie B players
Serie C players
Serie D players
Footballers from Calabria